Radek Štěpánek was the defending champion, but chose not to compete.

Sergiy Stakhovsky won the title, defeating Thomaz Bellucci 6–2, 7–5 in the final.

Seeds

Draw

Finals

Top half

Bottom half

References
 Main Draw
 Qualifying Draw

Singles
2014 ATP Challenger Tour